Ján Minárik (born 25 July 1997) is a Slovak professional footballer who currently plays for Fortuna Liga club MŠK Žilina as a defender.

Club career

MŠK Žilina
Minárik made his Fortuna Liga debut for Žilina in an away match at OMS Aréna against Senica on 23 February 2019. Minárik had played the full game as Šošoni recorded a narrow 1:0 victory, thanks to a free-kick goal by Michal Tomič.

References

External links
 MŠK Žilina official club profile
 
 Futbalnet profile
 

1997 births
Living people
Sportspeople from Žilina
Slovak footballers
Association football defenders
MŠK Žilina players
2. Liga (Slovakia) players
Slovak Super Liga players